The 1912 Princeton Tigers football team represented Princeton University in the 1912 college football season. The team finished with a 7–1–1 record under first-year head coach Walter G. Andrews, outscoring opponents by a total of 322 to 35 with the sole loss being to Harvard by 16–6 score. Princeton W. John Logan was selected as a consensus first-team honoree on the 1912 College Football All-America Team, and five other players (halfback Hobey Baker, fullback Wallace "Butch" De Witt, guard Rip Shenk, and tackles Phillips and Penfield) were selected as first-team honorees by at least one selector.

Schedule

References

Princeton
Princeton Tigers football seasons
Princeton Tigers football